Chinese Wine is a 2016 Chinese historical romance drama film directed by Song Jiangbo and stars Huang Yi, Van Fan, Winston Chao, Hou Tianlai, Shi Zhaoqi, and Terence Yin. It was released in China on January 15, 2016.

Plot

Cast
 Van Fan as Cao Huairen, the winemaker of Kweichow Moutai.
 Gu Wenze as young Cao Huairen.
 Huang Yi as Cheng Yuping, Cao's wife, a female winemaker who loves Cao's brother, Cao Huaiyuan, a twist of fate, she was married to Cao Huairen.
 Hou Tianlai as Cao Jinghu, Cao's father.
 Shi Zhaoqi as Cheng Zijing, Cheng Yuping's father.
 Zheng Weili as Cheng's wife
 Terence Yin as Cheng Yufeng
 Wang Zicheng as Cheng Huaiyuan
 Xu Dongdong as Shi Ying, a female Red Army soldier.
 Winston Chao as Businessman Hua.

Production
This film was shot in Yunnan, Guizhou, and Chongqing.

On December 15, 2015, the Kweichow Moutai Co., Ltd. announced that the film was scheduled for release on January 15, 2016.

Release
The film was released on January 15, 2016, in China.

Box office
The film's opening day gross was ￥1.327 million, by the weekend, the film's accumulated grossed reached ￥3.85 million.

References

External links
 
 

2016 films
Films set in Guizhou
Films shot in Yunnan
Films shot in Guizhou
Films shot in Chongqing
Chinese romantic drama films
2016 romantic drama films